Melito di Porto Salvo railway station is the main railway station of the Italian city of Melito di Porto Salvo, Calabria and it is part of the Jonica railway.

History 
The station was built by Società per le Strade Ferrate Calabro-Sicule as part of the extension of the Jonica railway from Lazzaro to Bianco, opened on 1 October 1868. In 1999, the station was equipped with a new station building and in April 2007 the station and the railway line south of it were electrified.

Layout 
The station has three tracks, one side platform and one island platform. Before 2007, the station had also another track and another side platform, later destroyed by a storm and not rebuilt. The station building features the waiting room, a cafe, the ticket machine area and the toilet.

Services 
The station is served by regional, suburban and InterCity trains operated by Trenitalia.

References

External links

Railway stations in Calabria
Railway stations opened in 1868
1868 establishments in Italy
Railway stations in Italy opened in the 19th century